One by One may refer to:

Film and television 
 One by One (2014 film)
 One by One (2004 film), a Disney animated short film
 One by One (1968 film), directed by Rafael R. Marchent
 One by One (1973 film)
 One by One (1975 film), film about Grand Prix racing narrated by Stacy Keach with a score by Stomu Yamashta
 One by One (TV series), a 1980s UK television drama

Music

Albums 
 One by One (Art Blakey album), 1981
 One by One (Foo Fighters album), 2002
 One by One (The Impressions album), 1965
 One by One, a 1960 album by The Coasters
 One by One, an album by The Free Design
 One X One, 2004 album by Chemistry

Songs 
 "One by One" (Cher song), 1987
"One by One" (Kitty Wells and Red Foley song), 1954
 "One by One", a song by Alter Bridge from Blackbird
 "One by One", a song by Chumbawamba from Tubthumper
 "One by One", a song by Enya from A Day Without Rain
 "One by One", a song by Immortal from Sons of Northern Darkness
 "One by One", a song by Laza Morgan
 "One by One", a song by Lebo M. from The Lion King
 "One by One", a song by Looking Glass from Looking Glass
 "One by One", a song by the Mighty Lemon Drops from World Without End
 "One by One", a song by The Ting Tings from Sounds from Nowheresville
 "One by One", a song by Unkle Bob from Sugar & Spite
 "One by One", a song with lyrics by Woody Guthrie and music by Jeff Tweedy, first recorded by Billy Bragg and Wilco on the album Mermaid Avenue
 "One by One", a song by Hootie & the Blowfish from Musical Chairs

See also 
 One Times One (disambiguation)